The Banquet of the Officers of the St George Militia Company in 1627 refers to a schutterstuk painted by Frans Hals for the St. George (or St. Joris) civic guard of Haarlem, and today is considered one of the main attractions of the Frans Hals Museum there.

In this group, each man wears a sash belonging to the color of the "rot", in this painting all three are represented with their flag-bearers wearing the colours Orange, white or blue. These officers were selected by the council of Haarlem to serve for three years, and this group had just finished their tenure and celebrated their end of service with a portrait. The man with the orange sash holding a glass of wine sitting at the table on the left and looking at Captain Michiel de Wael with an empty glass, is Colonel Aart Jansz Druyvesteyn, who heads the table.

The men featured are from left to right Lieutenant Cornelis Boudewijns (standing above Colonel Aernout Druyvesteyn), Captain Nicolaes Verbeek, Flag bearer Boudewijn van Offenberg, Lieutenant Jacob Pietersz Olycan, Captain Michiel de Wael, and above him, standing, is Flag bearer Dirck Dicx looking down at Jacob Olycan. Just behind him in the background is the servant Arent Jacobsz Koets, and below him, seated, is Lieutenant Frederik Coning. Behind the servant in the far right, is the flag bearer Jacob Cornelisz Schout who towers above the dwarf in the lower right, Captain Nicolaes le Febure.

St. Jorisdoelen

The painting previously hung with others in the old "St. Jorisdoelen" complex, known today as the Proveniershuis.  The paintings by Hals and others hung in the main hall of the complex in the Grote Houtstraat. Today a hofje with the main hall used as a restaurant, the main buildings were used for years as an inn, where the schutterstukken were tourist attractions. Today all of the schutterstukken that once hung here have been transferred to the Frans Hals Museum.

See also
 The Banquet of the Officers of the St George Militia Company in 1616
 The Officers of the St George Militia Company in 1639
List of paintings by Frans Hals

References

De Haarlemse Schuttersstukken, by Jhr. Mr. C.C. van Valkenburg, pp. 47–76, Haerlem : jaarboek 1961, 
Frans Hals: Exhibition on the Occasion of the Centenary of the Municipal Museum at Haarlem, 1862–1962., pp 36–38, publication Frans Hals Museum, 1962

1627 paintings
Portraits by Frans Hals
History of Haarlem
Militia group portraits
Collections in the Frans Hals Museum
Flags in art
Food and drink paintings